The College of the Arts (COTA) is an institution of arts education in Windhoek, the capital of Namibia. In 2011, it employed 39 lecturers full-time and 75 on part-time basis. The institution had 450 students studying towards a diploma, a further 650 enrolled in fee-financed courses, and 4,800 students participated in community-based programs organised by the college.

COTA was established by people of German heritage in 1971 as a Whites-only state conservatory of music. In the mid-80s drama and visual arts were added to the Conservatory's programs, and in 1990 it was renamed College for the Arts.

The seven full-time degree programs currently offered are African Performing Arts, Visual Art and Fashion Design, Television Production, Radio Production, New Media Design, and Music and Sound Production. Tertiary programs are offered as three-year courses of studies. COTA's leitmotiv is "Lifelong learning through the arts".

References

Education in Windhoek
Educational institutions established in 1971
Windhoek
Art schools in Namibia
Universities in Namibia
1971 establishments in South West Africa